is a Japanese footballer currently playing as a midfielder for SC Sagamihara.

His younger brother Mizuki is also a professional footballer currently playing for J2 League side Mito HollyHock.

Career statistics

Club
.

Notes

References

External links

1996 births
Living people
Association football people from Ōita Prefecture
Komazawa University alumni
Japanese footballers
Association football midfielders
Japan Football League players
J2 League players
J3 League players
Honda Lock SC players
Vanraure Hachinohe players
SC Sagamihara players